Acacia tetragonophylla, commonly known as curara, kurara or dead finish, is a tree in the family Fabaceae that is endemic to arid and semi-arid parts of central and western Australia.

Description
Like most Acacia species, it has phyllodes rather than true leaves. When young they are soft and pliable, but as they mature they become hard, rigid and very sharp. The glabrous phyllodes are formed in groups of two to six on dwarf, knotty and lateral branchlets or singly on new shoots. The phyllodes have a slender linear shape ending in a sharp point and are mostly pentagonal to compressed in cross-section with five to seven prominent nerves. In Western Australia it blooms between May and October producing yellow flowers. The flowers are yellow, and held in spherical clusters. The pods are papery, up to eight centimetres long and about five millimetres wide.

Distribution
It occurs on floodplains and along watercourses in arid and semi-arid areas throughout Western Australia, South Australia, southern Northern Territory, and east to near Charleville, Queensland and Brewarrina, New South Wales and is known to grow in a variety of habitats and soil types. In Western Australia it is found in the Pilbara, Gascoyne, Mid West, Wheatbelt and Goldfields-Esperance regions.

Taxonomy
The species was first formally described by the botanist Ferdinand von Mueller in 1863 as part of the work Fragmenta Phytographiae Australiae. It was reclassified as Racosperma tetragonophyllum by Leslie Pedley in 2003 then transferred back to genus Acacia in 2006. It is often confused with Acacia sphacelata.

Uses
Aboriginal people in Central Australia collect the seeds to make seedcakes. Its name in Pitjantjajara is Wakalpuka.

Acacia tetragonophylla can be used to treat warts.
"A number of [Acacia tetragonophylla] phyllodes may be inserted into the wart, the main part then being broken off to leave the apices embedded in the wart. After four or five days the wart has shrivelled and may be removed easily."

See also
List of Acacia species

References

tetragonophylla
Fabales of Australia
Flora of New South Wales
Flora of the Northern Territory
Flora of Queensland
Flora of South Australia
Acacias of Western Australia
Australian Aboriginal bushcraft
Taxa named by Ferdinand von Mueller
Plants described in 1863